Peter McArthur Fisher (17 February 1920 – December 2010) was a Scottish professional football who played as a full-back. He played over 100 games in the English football league between spells at Northampton Town, Shrewsbury Town and Wrexham.

References

1920 births
2010 deaths
Footballers from Edinburgh
Scottish footballers
Northampton Town F.C. players
Shrewsbury Town F.C. players
Wrexham A.F.C. players
Bedford Town F.C. players
Association football fullbacks